Ablon is a commune in the Calvados department in the Normandy region in northwestern France.

The inhabitants of the commune are known as Ablonnais or Ablonnaises.

Geography
Ablon is 5 km south east of Honfleur and 16 km north-west of Pont-Audemer with its northern border on the Seine Estuary.  It can be reached on Highway D580A from Honfleur turning right on the small country road called Cote de Vats to reach the village of Ablon. Road D140 (Route de Genneville) from Genneville in the south passes through the western side of the commune to join the D580a just outside the commune. The D144 road forms the southern border of the commune. Ablon is in the north-eastern corner of the Calvados department with its eastern border being the departmental border with Eure.

The Morelle river passes through the north of the commune from east to west although oddly does not form part of the commune. The Canal de Retour is parallel to it but also does not form part of the commune.

Toponymy
The name of the village is attested as far back as 1180 as Abelon.

One theory states that the town's name comes from the Norse Epi-lundr, meaning “apple orchard”. The nearby village of Yébleron shares this etymology. The ancient scandinavian lundr meaning orchard or wood has regularly been followed by the suffix -lon (for example, Bouquelon, Écaquelon, Yquelon, etc.).

Another theory suggests that the town's name derives from the Germanic personal name Abilo, followed by the suffix -o/-one, but this suffix does not usually accompany Germanic personal names. It has also been suggested that the name is based solely on the name ‘Abilo' with no suffix but the usage of a personal name with no suffix or epithet would be exceptional among Norman place names.

A third theory suggests that Ablon comes from the Germanic personal name Abbo followed by the suffix -lon. If this is the case the name of the town means “Abbo's wood”.

The similarity with the nearby village of Ablon-sur-Seine is coincidental.

History
In 1809, Ablon grew in size following its union with two neighbouring communes: Crémanville and Ableville.

Ablon was the site of a Nobel dynamite factory from 1879 until 1989. The factory ceased operations following an explosion on 3 March 1988 which killed 5, including the factory's director, and left 8 injured. Windows were broken more than a kilometre away in the village of Honfleur.

Administration

List of Successive Mayors of Ablon

Population

Culture and heritage

Civil heritage
The commune has two buildings that are registered as historical monuments:
The Chateau of Ablon (1767 and 1845)
The Dynamite Factory (1885 to 1916). The factory contains several items that are registered as historical objects:
A Dreiswerke moulding machine (1952)
A Weighing machine (20th century)
A Nitroglycerine production line (20th century)

Other sites of interest
La Houssaye Manor-farm

Religious heritage

The Parish Church of Saint-Pierre contains one item that is registered as an historical object:
A Baptismal font (12th  century)

See also
 Communes of the Calvados department

References

External links
Ablon official website 
Ablon on the old IGN website 
Ablon on Géoportail, National Geographic Institute (IGN) website 
Ablon on the 1750 Cassini Map

Communes of Calvados (department)